The 2004–05 Wessex Football League was the 19th season of the Wessex Football League, and the first in which the league consisted of three divisions, with two new sections being added. The league champions for the second time in their history were Lymington & New Milton, who were promoted to the Isthmian League. There was a full programme of promotion and relegation between the three divisions.

For sponsorship reasons, the league was known as the Sydenhams Wessex League.

League tables

Division One
Division One consisted of 22 clubs, the same as the single division of the previous season, after Blackfield & Langley and Whitchurch United were relegated and two new clubs joined:
Hamworthy United, joining from the Dorset Premier League.
VT, joining from the Hampshire League.

Division Two
Division Two also consisted of 22 clubs, 17 of them joining from the Hampshire League Premier Division, plus:
Alresford Town, joining from the Hampshire League Division One.
Blackfield & Langley, relegated from the single division of the Wessex League of the previous season.
Romsey Town, joining from the Hampshire League Division Two.
Shaftesbury, joining from the Dorset Premier League.
Whitchurch United, relegated from the single division of the Wessex League of the previous season.

Division Three
Division Three also consisted of 22 clubs, 13 of them joining from the Hampshire League Division One, and nine from Division Two – they were DC, Hamble Club, Ludgershall Sports, Netley Central Sports, Ordnance Survey, Otterbourne, QK Southampton, RS Basingstoke and Yateley Green.

References

Wessex Football League seasons
9